The women's 5000 metres race of the 2013 World Single Distance Speed Skating Championships was held on 23 March at 17:35 local time.

Results

References

Women 05000
World